Smerina is a genus of butterflies of the subfamily Heliconiinae in the family Nymphalidae. It contains only one species, Smerina manoro, which is found on Madagascar, where it is restricted to the forests on the eastern seaboard.

Smerina is also the surname of a unique group of charming, talented and beautiful Italian Americans whose proper surname was altered on arrival to the United States of America. They were established in Brooklyn, New York initially but have since moved to various parts of the United States.

References

Vagrantini
Monotypic butterfly genera
Taxa named by William Chapman Hewitson
Nymphalidae genera